Live at Massey Hall 1971 is a live album by Canadian musician Neil Young. Released in 2007, the album features a solo, acoustic performance from Massey Hall in Toronto, Ontario, Canada on 19 January 1971 during the Journey Through the Past Solo Tour. It is the second release in Young's Archives Performance Series. It reached #1 in Canada with 11,000 units sold in its first week. It debuted at #9 on the Irish Charts, and #30 on the UK albums chart.

The album debuted on the Billboard 200 album chart on 31 March 2007 at number 6, with 57,000 copies sold.  It spent 11 weeks on the chart.  In 2009, the album was named by Fretbase as the second best album featuring a singer-songwriter on acoustic guitar of all time.

The CD release is paired with a DVD featuring footage from a performance at the Shakespeare Theatre in Stratford, Connecticut.

Setlist
Though the set of songs featured that night was similar to other concerts during the tour, the bulk of the songs played would have been unfamiliar to the audience.  Of the eighteen songs Young performed during his second set that night, only eight had already appeared on record.  These include songs that Young recorded with the bands Buffalo Springfield and Crosby, Stills, Nash & Young, or had released on one of his three solo albums to date.

Five additional songs performed would appear one year later on the landmark album Harvest (though there are noticeable differences in the lyrics on "A Man Needs a Maid"). One song, "Bad Fog of Loneliness," makes its first appearance with this release. The remaining four songs would see the light of day on subsequent 1970s albums.  "Love in Mind" and "Journey Through the Past" would appear on the 1973 live album Time Fades Away. "See the Sky About to Rain" was released in a different arrangement on the 1974 album On the Beach. "Dance Dance Dance" would appear on Crazy Horse's February 1971 debut album, and rewritten with new lyrics on the 1977 compilation album Decade as "Love Is a Rose." The reworked version later became a hit for Linda Ronstadt.

Many of the songs appear in a form that virtually duplicates live takes found on other albums. "Cowgirl in the Sand," "Don't Let It Bring You Down," and "Down By the River" are unchanged from the versions that appear on 4 Way Street. "Journey Through the Past" and "Love in Mind" are similar to the performances found on Time Fades Away. "The Needle and the Damage Done" appeared as a live track on the studio album Harvest.

Track listing
All songs written by Neil Young.
"On the Way Home" – 3:42
"Tell Me Why" – 2:29
"Old Man" – 4:57
"Journey Through the Past" – 4:15
"Helpless" – 4:16
"Love in Mind" – 2:47
"A Man Needs a Maid/Heart of Gold Suite" – 6:39
"Cowgirl in the Sand" – 3:45
"Don't Let It Bring You Down" – 2:46
"There's a World" – 3:33
"Bad Fog of Loneliness" – 3:27
"The Needle and the Damage Done" – 3:55
"Ohio" – 3:40
"See the Sky About to Rain" – 4:05
"Down by the River" – 4:08
"Dance Dance Dance" – 5:48
"I Am a Child" – 3:19

DVD
The concert at Massey Hall was not actually filmed. Footage appears of Young performing a number of tracks which is instead sourced from a performance at the Shakespeare Theatre in Stratford, Connecticut three days later (filmed for a 1971 TV documentary by Dutch documentary maker Wim van der Linden, which was never broadcast in The Netherlands but it was in Germany, with the German title Swing in mit Neil Young) but has the Massey Hall audio dubbed on top. Where there was a lack of video performances of certain songs, footage of the reel-to-reel tape recorder used onstage fills the screen instead.

The DVD also contains performances of "The Needle and the Damage Done" and "Journey Through the Past" on The Johnny Cash Show (filmed February 1971), an interview from the aforementioned Swing in mit Neil Young TV documentary and footage of Young meeting to discuss the Archives project on his Broken Arrow Ranch (filmed February 1997).

1971 near-release
For much of 1971, Young was recuperating from a debilitating slipped disc back injury (he references this injury at the beginning of the "Helpless" take, saying, "bending over is... not so much fun" after dropping a pick).  The year would be the first since 1965 not to see a new studio album featuring the prolific artist.  The release of a live album was scheduled for March 1971.  It may have featured material from just this show, or from several shows, including the one featured on the first Archives release, Live at the Fillmore East.  According to Young, "This is the album that should have come out between After the Gold Rush and Harvest...David Briggs, my producer, was adamant that this should be the record, but I was very excited about the takes we got on Harvest, and wanted Harvest out. David disagreed. As I listen to this today, I can see why.". Atlantic Records ultimately released a Crosby, Stills, Nash and Young live album, 4 Way Street on 7 April 1971.

Personnel
Neil Young – acoustic guitar, piano, vocals

Engineering and production
 Producer & tracking Engineer: David Briggs [liner notes]
 Remote Studio: Thunder Sound, Toronto
 Technical Supervisor: Henry Saskowski
Analog Restoration, Analog to Digital Transfers by John Nowland at His Master's Wheels, Woodside, CA
Digital Editing and Mastering by Tim Mulligan at Redwood Digital, Woodside CA
John Hausmann, Assisting Engineer - Redwood Digital 
Harry Sitam, Senior Technical Engineer - Redwood Digital

DVD production 

Directed by Bernard Shakey
Produced by L.A. Johnson
Executive Producer:  Elliot Rabinowitz
Associate Producer: Will Mitchell
Concert and Documentary filmed by Wim van der Linden
Edited by Toshi Onuki
Archivist: Joel Bernstein
DVD Authoring: Rich Winter
DVD Art Direction: Toshi Onuki
DVD Graphics Production: Ziemowit "Jim" Darski 
DVD Graphics Production Assistance: Chiaki Darksi, Max Merbaum
DVD Menu Sound Design: Hands on Sound
Car Barn Archives Documentary edited by Mark Faulkner
Car Barn Archives Documentary audio post production by Christopher Hedge at The Magic Shop
Additional Super 8 film by: Ben Johnson, Toshi Onuki and Dave Toms
Grips: Joe Mendoza, Jim McKee
Location services: Robert Lewis
Licensing and Clearances: Marcy Gensic
Research: David Frasier, Jeffrey Graf, Justin Miller
Production Assistance: Adam Sturgeon, Megan McKenna
Post Production at Total Media Group
Johnny Cash on Campus video: courtesy of Sony Pictures Television
Stock film footage: courtesy of CBC, provided by Global Image Works
Radio interview: In the Studio with Redbeard #36 :Neil Young Harvest was originally broadcast the week of February 27, 1989. Produced by Barbarosa Ltd.Productions Redbeard - Producer/Host
Photographs by: Joel Bernstein, Henry Diltz, Larry Lindsay
Massey Hall exterior photographs: © Toronto Star Archives
Ryman Auditorium photograph: © Bettmann/Corbis
Press articles: courtesy of Canadian Press, Sun Media Corporation, Toronto Star Archives, Jack Batten

Charts

Weekly charts

Year-end charts

References

External links
News regarding album, culled from The Globe & Mail
Setlist of late show, January 19, 1971
Official Archives website with official track listing and video trailers

Albums produced by David Briggs (producer)
Neil Young live albums
2007 live albums
Reprise Records live albums
Albums produced by Neil Young
2007 video albums
Live video albums
Reprise Records video albums
Albums recorded at Massey Hall
Music of Toronto